The Baptist Convention of Western Cuba is a Baptist Christian denomination in Cuba. It is affiliated with the Baptist World Alliance. The headquarters is in Havana.

History
The Baptist Convention of Western Cuba has its origins in an American mission of the International Mission Board in 1898.  It is officially founded in 1905.  According to a denomination census released in 2020, it claimed 538 churches and 27,620 members.

See also
 Bible
 Born again
 Baptist beliefs
 Worship service (evangelicalism)
 Jesus Christ
 Believers' Church

References

External links
 Official Website

Baptist denominations in the Caribbean
Baptist Christianity in Cuba